The  or "Tall Pine Tree Ancient Burial Mound" in Japanese is an ancient circular tomb in Asuka village, Nara Prefecture, Japan.

History
The tomb is thought to have been built at some time between the end of the 7th century and the beginning of the 8th century. It was accidentally discovered by a local farmer in the 1960s.

Description
The mound of the tomb was built of alternating layers of clay and sand. Excavation yielded a burial chamber with painted fresco wall paintings of courtiers in Goguryeo-style garb. The paintings are in full color with red, blue, gold, and silver foil representing four male followers and four serving maidens together with the Azure Dragon, Black Tortoise, White Tiger, and Vermilion Bird groups of stars. The paintings are designated a National Treasure.

For whom the tomb was built is unknown, but the decorations suggest it is for a member of the Japanese royal family or a high-ranking nobleman. Candidates include:

 Prince Osakabe (d. 705), a son of Emperor Tenmu
 Prince Yuge (d. 699), also a son of Emperor Tenmu
 Prince Takechi ( – 696), also a son of Emperor Temmu, general of Jinshin War, Daijō Daijin
 Isonokami Ason Maro (640–717), a descendant of Mononobe clan and in charge of Fujiwara-kyō after the capital was moved to Heijō-kyō
 Kudara no Konikishi Zenkō (617–700), a son of the last king of Baekje, one of the Three Kingdoms of Korea.

Conservation
The Cultural Affairs Agency of Japan is considering taking apart the stone chamber and reassembling it elsewhere to prevent further deterioration to its wall paintings. A painting called Asuka Bijin, or "beautiful women", is one of the murals in the tomb facing deterioration. The unusual preservation method is being considered because the tomb's current situation makes it impossible to prevent further damage and stop the spread of mold.

Unlike the Kitora Tomb, in Asuka removing pieces of the Takamatsuzuka wall plaster and reinforcing them for conservation appears difficult because the plaster has numerous tiny cracks.

Comparison
In 2012, similar mural was found in a tomb in Mongolia. The round mound, thought to be built by Göktürks in the 7th century, was excavated by Mongolian and Kazakh researchers. The mural depicts Azure Dragon and White Tiger with a procession of Chinese and Sogdian, and other Caucasoid traders.

See also
Detachment of wall paintings
List of National Treasures of Japan (paintings)
List of Special Places of Scenic Beauty, Special Historic Sites and Special Natural Monuments
Asuka-Fujiwara

References

External links

 Takamatsuzuka ancient burial mound
 The Japan Times Weekly Online - Takamatsuzuka tomb to be moved
 Paekche Culture in Asuka Japan
 Asuka Historical Museum

Kofun
National Treasures of Japan
Special Historic Sites
Buildings and structures in Nara Prefecture
History of Nara Prefecture